Sigurd Ulveseth (born 13 July 1953) is a Norwegian jazz musician (Upright bass) and Orchestra leader, known from a number of album releases.

Career 
Ulveseth was born in Bergen. With his own quartet, he has released three albums. The band consists of Adam Nussbaum (drums), Knut Riisnæs (saxophone), and Dag Arnesen (piano).  He is also part of "Marit Sandvik Band", the band "SWAP" with Jan Gunnar Hoff, "North West Quartet" with Frode Nymo among others.  
He has recorded with Bergen musicians Dag Arnesen, Frank Jakobsen, Tore Faye, Knut Kristiansen, Ole Jacob Hystad, Jan Kåre Hystad and Merethe Mikkelsen. Moreover, he toured Vietnam with Urban Connection.

Honors 
Vossajazzprisen 1998
The 10th Sildajazz Award 2009

Discography 
1995: To wisdom, the prize (Gemini Music)
1997: Infant eyes (Gemini)
2001: Wish I knew (Gemini)

References 

1953 births
Living people
Norwegian jazz upright-bassists
Male double-bassists
Jazz double-bassists
Musicians from Bergen
Taurus Records artists
21st-century double-bassists
21st-century Norwegian male musicians
Male jazz musicians